Sydor or Sidor may refer to:

People
 Andrzej Sydor (born 1937), Polish chess player
 Alison Sydor (born 1966), Canadian cross country mountain cyclist 
 Darryl Sydor (born 1972), Canadian professional ice hockey defenceman
 David Albin Zywiec Sidor (1947–2020), American-Nicaraguan Roman Catholic bishop 
 Dmytro Sydor (born 1955), Ukrainian/Rusyn priest and political activist
 Christian Sidor (fl. 1994–2005), paleontologist
 Karol Sidor (1901–1953), far right Slovak nationalist politician
 A nickname of Oleksandr Sydorenko (born 1960), Soviet swimmer

Other
 Sydor, Sidor, Sydir, variations of the given name Isidore
 SIDOR, a Venezuelan steel corporation
 Sydor, an Elfquest character

See also
 
 
 Sidorov (disambiguation)
 Sidorenko, a surname

Ukrainian-language surnames